Staroakbulatovo (İśke Aqbulat) is a rural locality (a village) in Akbulatovsky Selsoviet, Mishkinsky District, Bashkortostan, Russia. The population was 151 as of 2010. There are 2 streets.

Geography 
Staroakbulatovo is located 6 km south of Mishkino (the district's administrative centre) by road. Unur is the nearest rural locality.

References 

Rural localities in Mishkinsky District